Rufus King (1755–1827) was a U.S. Senator from New York.

Rufus King may also refer to:
 William R. King (William Rufus DeVane King, 1786–1853), vice president of the United States
 Rufus King (general) (1814–1876), American Civil War general
 Rufus King (lawyer) (1817–1891), American university president from Cincinnati 
 Rufus H. King (1820–1890), U.S. Representative from New York
 Rufus King Jr. (1838–1900), American Civil War officer and Medal of Honor recipient
 Rufus King (writer) (1893–1966), American mystery writer
 Rufus G. King III (born 1942), former chief judge of the Superior Court of the District of Columbia
 Rufus King (band), an alternative rock band active between 1993 and 2000
 SS Rufus King, a Liberty ship
 Rufus King International High School, Milwaukee, Wisconsin
 Rufus King International Middle School, Milwaukee, Wisconsin

See also
 Rufus King Delafield (1802–1874), American banker and manufacturer